Emiel Remco Mellaard (born 21 March 1966) is a retired Dutch long jumper, best known for winning the 1989 European Indoor Championships.

Mellaard was the first Dutch long jumper to break the 8-metre barrier, when in 1987 he jumped 8.02. With this achievement he took over Henk Visser's legendary Dutch record of 7.98, set in 1956.

His personal best was 8.19 metres, achieved in July 1988 in Groningen. This is the current Dutch record on outdoor tracks. However, Emiel Mellaard is one of the few athletes who produced his very best performance on an indoor track. In 1989 he jumped 8.23 metres in The Hague, a few weeks before he would become European Indoor Champion. This achievement remains the current Dutch indoor record.

International competitions

1Representing Europe

References

External links

1966 births
Living people
Dutch male long jumpers
Olympic athletes of the Netherlands
Athletes (track and field) at the 1988 Summer Olympics
People from Spijkenisse
World Athletics Championships athletes for the Netherlands
Sportspeople from South Holland
20th-century Dutch people